The Fittipaldi F6 was a Formula One car designed by Ralph Bellamy and used by Fittipaldi Automotive in the 1979 Formula One season. The engine was a Ford Cosworth DFV, and the car was driven by Brazilian Emerson Fittipaldi but achieved no points during the season. The car was modified to become the F6A, used later in 1979 and was succeeded by the Fittipaldi F7.

Racing History
The F6 made its debut at the 1979 South African Grand Prix with Brazilian driver and team co-owner Emerson Fittipaldi who finished 13th. The team entered the F5A because the F6 was being updated into the F6A. It was next seen in Germany but the Brazilian retired with an electrical fault. The Austrian Grand Prix saw Fittipaldi retire with brake failure. At Holland the Brazilian retired with an electrical fault. The Italian Grand Prix saw Fittipaldi finish eighth. The Brazilian finished eighth at Canada where the team hired another Brazilian, Alex Ribeiro who failed to qualify. The United States Grand Prix East saw Fittipaldi finish seventh and Ribeiro fail to qualify. The F6A was replaced by the Fittipaldi F7 (a 1979 Wolf WR7).

Fittipaldi finished the season in twelfth place in the Constructors' Championship with one point which had been scored by the F5A.

Complete Formula One World Championship results
(key)

 1 point scored using the Fittipaldi F5A.

References

Fittipaldi Formula One cars